Telephone counseling refers to any type of psychological service performed over the telephone. Telephone counseling ranges from individual, couple or group psychotherapy with a professional therapist to psychological first aid provided by para-professional counselors. In-person therapists often advise clients to make use of telephone crisis counseling to provide the client with an avenue to obtain support outside of therapy if they cannot be reached in an emergency or at the conclusion of a therapeutic relationship.

Telephone counseling is also provided by crisis hotlines, quitlines, and child helplines.

Professional counseling by telephone
Researchers have begun observing a growing trend in which licensed psychotherapists and psychologists are now seeing at least some of their clients via the telephone. A body of research exists comparing the efficacy of telephone counseling to in-person counseling and to no treatment. A recent study found that more than half of clients (58%) who had experienced both in-person and phone counseling preferred phone counseling. A 2002 study found that phone counseling clients rate their counseling relationship similarly to in-person clients. Phone counseling has been established as an effective treatment for diagnoses ranging from depression to agoraphobia.

Crisis hotlines

Crisis hotlines, also known as helplines, provide telephone support services which   often serve the primary function of suicide prevention.  However, many of these helplines also accept calls from people who are not in active suicidal crisis, and the term "emotional support helpline" is sometimes used to avoid the implication that a caller must be in crisis to use these services. Some emotional support services employ email and messaging technologies. Crisis hotlines may be state-funded or provided by churches or charities.

Quitlines

Quitlines are helplines that offer advanced treatment for addiction and behavior change. Quitlines should not be confused with centralized call centers offering advice in a wide spectrum of fields for the purpose of receiving and transmitting a large volume of requests.

Child helplines
Child helplines are help and support services for children, run by civil society organizations and or government bodies. Child helplines specialize in offering information, support, advice or counseling to people 18 years of age or younger. Child Helpline International, an international network of child helplines, was formed in 2003 to support the development of child helplines and enable the information gathered by child helplines around the world on children's rights and welfare issues to be assembled for advocacy purposes.

Advantages over in-person therapy 
Unlike other forms of counseling, telephone counseling is potentially free of certain constraining factors that affect traditional therapy, including geography, time, duration, and cost, making this form of counseling more accessible for a number of people who would be unable to attend traditional psychotherapy. It also provides a degree of anonymity that is comforting to some callers, reducing the intimidation that some people may feel at the prospect of seeking treatment with a traditional in-person therapist and encouraging disclosure. Also research shows telephone counseling to have better results among patients with depression.

Disadvantages over in-person therapy
Being physically present with your counselor may help you feel more connected with him or her; the telephone may contribute to "distance" in the therapeutic relationship.  Some people feel safer letting themselves become emotional in the physical presence of another person.

Because the client often calls from a location that is part of their day-to-day life, calls often center around, or are interrupted by, situational pressures that the person is currently immersed in. This can have both positive and negative effects on the counseling provided; by allowing the counselor some insight into the person's situation, the counselor can be more objective. Conversely, the disruptions and pressures of situational factors may make it difficult for the client to adopt a reflective state or maintain full focus on the counseling session.

In the case of para-professional counseling (meaning a non-licensed therapist), there may not be guaranteed privacy; the electronic technologies involved make it difficult to prevent multiple phone connections, loudspeakers, or recording of the interactions. This fact may present a problem to a paranoid personality who suspects that others are monitoring his or her calls.

If the counseling is provided by an organization staffed by a number of employees or volunteers, a repeat caller cannot develop a relationship with a counselor in the same way as in traditional therapy, which may impede progress. These organizations typically limit calls in time and frequency, preventing deeper analysis and thus the use of therapeutic modalities that depend on it (i.e. psychoanalysis).

Phone counseling is not appropriate for people who are homicidal, suicidal, self injuring, or requiring more care than one session per week. Phone counselors may not be acquainted with local emergency service options.  Counselors at locally operated suicide hotlines are trained in emergency services and acquainted with local resources.

Examples of nonprofit telephone counseling services
 The Jeevan Aastha Helpline is an initiative by the Gandhinagar Police Department, Gujarat to provide assistance to those seeking immediate mental health counselling across India. The helpline has a toll free number 1800 233 3330 which can be called on 24/7. The team comprises eight counsellors and one senior counsellor, all of whom have at least a master's degree in Psychology.
 The Volunteer Emotional Support Helplines (VESH) is an organisation representing helplines in 61 countries. It has been formed by
New Zealand has a community-based, youth-oriented Telephone counseling service, Youthline. Based in 11 local centers around the country, Youthline enlists 1100 volunteers nationwide (100 of whom are working in an online context).
Australia has a national Telephone counseling service, Lifeline.  Also, the larger cities in Australia have other specialised Telephone counseling services, for example:  domestic violence, war-victims, youth, gambling, finances, substance abuse, parenting or child care.
The United States has a government-funded suicide prevention hotline called the National Suicide Prevention Lifeline, which provides 24/7 crisis intervention counseling to suicidal callers.  It involves thousands of volunteers at over 120 crisis centers nationwide.  It also has a 24/7 National Domestic Violence Hotline.
In the United Kingdom, well known helplines include ChildLine and The Samaritans. There are a range of specialist helplines for victims of rape, sexual violence and sexual abuse run by third sector organisations, many of which are brought together through membership of The Survivors Trust network.
In Canada, Kids Help Phone is the best known youth helpline, operating since 1989. Naseeha is the first youth helpline specifically for Muslim youth in Canada.
Childline India Foundation: CHILDLINE "1098"  is a non-profit helpline for children.
In Egypt, National council for childhood and motherhood provides the only helpline for domestic violence, reproductive health issues, family planning, marriage counseling, health education. Also receive reporting on any form of child trafficking victims. Clients are invited for in-person counseling sessions.
 Healmind is an initiative by the students of  National Institute for Empowerment of Persons with Multiple Disabilities in kerala to help those seeking mental health counselling in south india including Kerala , Tamilnadu ,Karnataka  their online service available  24/7. The team Healmind comprises six Clinical Psychologist whom have MPhil in Psychology.

See also 
 Crisis hotline
 Telepsychiatry
 List of counseling topics
 Online counselling
 Helpline
 Suicide helpline

References

External links
 Tele-psychology tool for Psychologists and Counselors

Psychotherapies
Counseling
Crisis hotlines
Telemedicine